This is a list of defunct national Greek umbrella councils for Greek lettered organizations.

Interfraternity Conference 

 Interfraternity Conference (IFC) - Organized in 1909. Changed its name to National Interfraternity Conference in 1931.
 National Interfraternity Conference (NIC) - Created in 1931 from the renaming of the Interfraternity Conference. Changed its name to North American Interfraternity Conference in 1999 in order to reflect the organization's Canadian membership.
 Fraternity Leadership Association (FLA) - Organized in 2002 by two fraternities that withdrew their membership in NIC due to a disenchantment with the strategic direction of the organization. They were joined by four other fraternities, which kept dual membership in NIC. Eventually, it dissolved.

Education sororities 

 Association of Pedagogical Sororities (APS) - Organized in 1915. Changed its name to Association of Educational Sororities at its third biennial conference.
 Association of Education Sororities (AES) - Created from the renaming of the Association of Pedagogical Sororities. Later, the word "Educational" was changed to "Education". In 1947, AES dissolved and its member organizations became Associate members of the National Panhellenic Conference (NPC), attaining Full membership four years later in 1951.

Professional fraternities 

 Professional Panhellenic Association (PPA) - Organized in 1925. In 1978, it merged with the Professional Interfraternity Conference to create the Professional Fraternity Association (PFA), as a result of the impact of Title IX on most fraternal groups with professional affiliations.
 Professional Interfraternity Conference (PIC) - Organized in 1928. In 1978, it merged with the above group to create the Professional Fraternity Association (PFA), as a result of the impact of Title IX on most fraternal groups with professional affiliations.

Ethnic fraternities 

 Concilio Nacional de Hermandades Latinas (CNHL) - Organized in 1996. In 2000, CNHL dissolved and its member organizations became members of the National Association of Latino Fraternal Organizations (NALFO).
 Latino Fraternal Council (LFC) - Organized in June 2000 as five Latino fraternities withdrew their respective CNHL or NALFO membership. LFC dissolved in June 2001, after only one year of existence.
 Latino Fraternal Caucus (LFC) - Caucus organized within North-American Interfraternity Conference in 2001 by its four Latino fraternity members. Eventually, it dissolved.
 Asian Greek Association (AGA) - Organized in 2004. Changed its name to National Asian Greek Council in 2005.
 National Asian Greek Council (NAGC) - Created from the renaming of the Asian Greek Association in 2005. After some restructuring, it changed its name to National Asian Pacific Islander American Panhellenic Association (NAPA) in 2006.

Student societies in the United States
Defunct fraternities and sororities
Greek letter umbrella organizations
Defunct organizations based in the United States
Lists of defunct organizations